Ballinatray Lower and Ballintray Upper are townlands in Gorey, County Wexford, Ireland.  Other townlands in Ireland are called Ballinatray as well.

References
 Griffiths Valuation of Ireland: Ardamine, County Wexford

Townlands of County Wexford
Gorey